Rudolf Meister (1 August 1897 – 11 September 1958) was a German general (General der Flieger) in the Luftwaffe during World War II who commanded the 4th Air Corps. He was a recipient of the Knight's Cross of the Iron Cross of Nazi Germany. Meister surrendered to the American troops in May 1945 and was interned until 1948.

In 1950, Meister was one of the authors of the Himmerod memorandum which addressed the issue of rearmament (Wiederbewaffnung) of the Federal Republic of Germany after World War II.

Awards and decorations

 German Cross in Gold on 30 October 1941 as Oberst im Generalstab (in the General Staff) of VIII. Fliegerkorps
 Knight's Cross of the Iron Cross on 5 September 1944 as Generalleutnant and commander of IV. Fliegerkorps

References

Citations

Bibliography

 
 

1897 births
1958 deaths
Military personnel from Cologne
Luftwaffe World War II generals
German Army personnel of World War I
People from the Rhine Province
Recipients of the Gold German Cross
Recipients of the Knight's Cross of the Iron Cross
German prisoners of war in World War II held by the United States
Prussian Army personnel
Reichswehr personnel
Recipients of the clasp to the Iron Cross, 1st class
Himmerod meeting participants